The National Basketball Association's first overall pick is the player who is selected first among all eligible draftees by a team during the annual National Basketball Association (NBA) draft. The first pick is awarded to the team that wins the NBA draft lottery; in most cases, that team had a losing record in the previous season. The team with the first pick attracts significant media attention, as does the player who is selected with that pick.

Eleven first picks have won the NBA Most Valuable Player Award: Oscar Robertson, Kareem Abdul-Jabbar (record six-time winner), Bill Walton, Magic Johnson (three-time winner), Hakeem Olajuwon, David Robinson, Shaquille O'Neal, Allen Iverson, Tim Duncan (two-time winner), LeBron James (four-time winner), and Derrick Rose (youngest winner).

China's Yao Ming (2002) and Italy's Andrea Bargnani (2006) are the only two players without competitive experience in the United States to be drafted first overall. Eleven other international players with U.S. college experience have been drafted first overall—Mychal Thompson (Bahamas) in 1978, Olajuwon (Nigeria) in 1984, Patrick Ewing (Jamaica) in 1985, Duncan (U.S. Virgin Islands) in 1997, Michael Olowokandi (Nigeria) in 1998, Andrew Bogut (Australia) in 2005, Kyrie Irving (Australia) in 2011, Anthony Bennett (Canada) in 2013, Andrew Wiggins (Canada) in 2014, Ben Simmons (Australia) in 2016, and Deandre Ayton (Bahamas) in 2018. Duncan is an American citizen, but is considered an "international" player by the NBA because he was not born in one of the fifty states or the District of Columbia. Ewing had dual Jamaican-American citizenship when he was drafted and Irving and Simmons had dual Australian-American citizenship when they were drafted.

Note that the drafts between 1947 and 1949 were held by the Basketball Association of America (BAA). The Basketball Association of America became the National Basketball Association after absorbing teams from the National Basketball League in the fall of 1949. Official NBA publications include the BAA Drafts as part of the NBA's draft history.

Key

List of first overall picks

See also

 List of first overall NBA G League draft picks
 List of first overall WNBA draft picks
 List of first overall Major League Baseball draft picks
 List of first overall National Football League draft picks
 List of first overall NHL draft picks

Notes

References
General

Specific

First overall draft pick
National Basketball Association lists
First-overall draft picks